Phillip "P. J." Walker Jr. (born February 26, 1995) is an American football quarterback for the Chicago Bears of the National Football League (NFL). He played college football at Temple, and was signed as an undrafted free agent by the Indianapolis Colts in 2017. He also played for the Houston Roughnecks of the XFL in 2020, leading the league in passing yards and touchdowns before it suspended operations due to the COVID-19 pandemic.

Early years
Walker was born in 1995 in Elizabeth, New Jersey, to parents Tamicha Drake and Phillip Walker Sr. Walker attended Elizabeth High School. During his junior year, Walker threw for 2,168 yards and 18 touchdowns, while going 120-of-189 (63.5 percent) in passing percentage. Following the completion of his high school career, Walker chose to attend Temple University, under head coach Matt Rhule.

College career
After accepting an athletic scholarship to attend Temple University, Walker played for coach Matt Rhule's Temple Owls team from 2013 to 2016.

2013 season
Walker began his collegiate career as a backup to Connor Reilly. Walker would eventually earn the starting spot at quarterback in week 6 against Cincinnati, where he would throw his first collegiate touchdown. Walker obtained his first win of his career in week 7 against Army, by a score of 33–14. He would receive his first collegiate weekly award (QB of the week – CFPA – honorable mention) following a 59–49 loss to SMU in week 9. In the final week of the season, Walker earned American Athletic Conference Offensive Player of the Week and was a finalist for the Manning Award. Walker would finish his freshman year having started 7 out of 12 games.

2014 season
Walker's sophomore season did not include as many highlights as his 2013 debut performance; however, Walker did earn career-high completions (29) and pass attempts (49) in a losing effort against Navy in Week 2. Walker was able to secure three honorable mentions during the season (Weeks 1, 2 and 4) and passed for at least 1 touchdown in his first seven games.

2015 season
Walker would start every game in his junior year, becoming only the third person to do so in Owl history. In a rare feat, Walker would both throw for and receive a pass in two two-point conversion attempts in Week 8 in a winning effort against UCF. Walker would lead the Owls to a 10–4 overall record (7–1 in conference play), earning a bid to the Boca Raton Bowl in losing effort against the Toledo Rockets by a score of 17–32. He finished the season with a school record 2,972 passing yards and tied the record for total offense (rushing and passing) with 3,179 yards.

2016 season

Walker's final year at Temple was a record-setting season for the senior. In the season opener against Army, Walker became Temple's all-time passing yards leader (10,273 yards). Walker would again lead the Owls to a bowl game at the end of the season, following a 10–4 overall record (8–0 in conference); Walker and the Owls would lose the Military Bowl 26–34 against Wake Forest. Additionally, Walker would receive numerous honors, accolades and watch-list nominations in the 2016 season, including American Athletic Conference Championship Game Most Outstanding Player, CFPA National Player of the Year Watch List, Davey O'Brien Award Watch List, as well as multiple preseason and conference recognitions.

Records
Walker is the Owls all-time leader in wins by a starting quarterback (28), passing yards, passing touchdowns, completions, attempts, total yards and total touchdowns. Walker led the Owls to their first conference title in 49 years (2016) and their first ever back-to-back bowl appearances in school history (2015 and 2016).

College statistics

Professional career

Indianapolis Colts
On May 3, 2017, Walker was signed by the Indianapolis Colts as an undrafted free agent. He was waived on September 2, 2017 and was signed to the Colts' practice squad the next day. He signed a reserve/future contract with the Colts on January 1, 2018. On September 1, 2018, Walker was waived by the Colts and was signed to the practice squad the next day. He spent time on and off the Colts practice squad before being released on December 26, 2018, but was re-signed three days later. He signed a reserve/future contract on January 13, 2019. On August 31, 2019, Walker was waived and signed to the practice squad the next day, only to be released two days later.

Houston Roughnecks
In October 2019, Walker was drafted by the newly formed XFL for the 2020 season. The Pittsburgh Steelers called the XFL office to ask if they could sign Walker in October 2019, but was blocked as he was already under contract with the league. He was then allocated to the Houston Roughnecks prior to the 2020 XFL Draft.

In the Roughnecks' first game against the Los Angeles Wildcats, Walker tossed four touchdowns, helping the team win a 37–17 victory. He was named the league's first ever Star of the Week for his performance. 

Walker's final game of the 2020 campaign was marked by some controversy after, while his team was leading the Seattle Dragons 32–23, he mistakenly kneeled on fourth down at his own 21-yard-line with three seconds remaining on the clock – officials either failed to notice or refused to deal with Walker's palpable timing error and declared the game over, thus depriving Seattle the opportunity to score a touchdown and potential three-point conversion to tie the game. The league later admitted it was a mistake, but declared that the result would stand.

On March 20, 2020, the season was canceled due to the COVID-19 pandemic. Walker finished the 2020 season with a 5–0 record, 1,338 passing yards and 15 touchdowns with four interceptions. He led the league in both passing touchdowns and passing yards. He was placed on the reserve/other league list after signing with the Panthers in March, which was later terminated after the league had fully suspended operations on April 10, 2020.

Carolina Panthers

On March 25, 2020, Walker signed a two-year contract with the Carolina Panthers worth up to $1.5 million, reuniting him with former Temple head coach Matt Rhule. On October 29, 2020, Walker came in for the Panthers during the third quarter against the Atlanta Falcons after an injury to Teddy Bridgewater. When playing, Walker only threw one pass completion for three yards to Robby Anderson in his four pass attempts and was benched once Bridgewater was ready to play again. After Bridgewater injured his right knee in the fourth quarter of the Panthers' Week 10 game against the Tampa Bay Buccaneers, Walker finished the game, throwing for two completions and 12 yards. With Bridgewater remaining injured, Walker made his first NFL start the following week and threw for 258 yards, one touchdown, and two interceptions in a 20–0 win.

On January 10, 2022, Walker re-signed with the Panthers. Walker began to get playing time following Baker Mayfield's injury in Week 5 against the San Francisco 49ers. In Week 7, Walker threw for 177 yards and two touchdowns in a 21–3 win over the Tampa Bay Buccaneers.

Chicago Bears
On March 16, 2023, Walker signed a two-year contract with the Chicago Bears.

Career statistics

XFL career statistics

NFL career statistics

References

External links
 Carolina Panthers bio
 Temple Owls bio

1995 births
Living people
Elizabeth High School (New Jersey) alumni
Players of American football from New Jersey
Sportspeople from Elizabeth, New Jersey
American football quarterbacks
Temple Owls football players
Indianapolis Colts players
Houston Roughnecks players
Carolina Panthers players
Chicago Bears players